The R519 is a Regional Route in South Africa.

Route
Its western terminus is Mookgophong (Naboomspruit), where it takes origin from the R101. It heads south-east crossing the  N1, until it meets the northern end of the R516. Thereafter it continues east to Roedtan where it crosses the N11 at a staggered junction. It then takes on a north-easterly direction, crossing the R518 near Zebediela. It ends its journey by joining the R101 just outside Polokwane (Pieterburg).

References

Regional Routes in Limpopo